H. Rider Haggard, KBE (1856–1925) was a British writer, largely of adventure fiction, but also of non-fiction. The eighth child of a Norfolk barrister and squire, through family connections he gained employment with Sir Henry Bulwer during the latter's service as lieutenant-governor of Natal, South Africa. Rider Haggard travelled to southern Africa in 1875 and remained in the country for six years, during which time he served as Master of the High Court of the Transvaal and an adjutant of the Pretoria Horse.

Rider Haggard's time in Africa proved inspirational for him, and while still in Natal he wrote two articles for The Gentleman's Magazine describing his experiences. He returned to Britain in 1881 and was called to the bar; while studying he wrote his first book, Cetywayo and His White Neighbours, a critical examination of Britain's policies in South Africa. Two years later he published his first work of fiction, Dawn. In 1885 he wrote one of his most popular novels, King Solomon's Mines—detailing the life of the adventurer Allan Quatermain—which was followed by She: A History of Adventure (1886), which introduced the female character Ayesha, both of which became series of books; according to the author Morton N. Cohen, writing for the Oxford Dictionary of National Biography, much of Rider Haggard's reputation rests on these two works. Although he mostly concentrated on his non-fiction and his novels, he also produced a number of short-stories, which have been released in three collections.

Rider Haggard was interested in land affairs and wrote several works on the subject; in 1895 he served on a government commission to examine Salvation Army labour colonies, and in 1911 he served on the Royal Commission examining coastal erosion. He was an inveterate letter writer to The Times, and had nearly 100 letters published by the newspaper.

Publications in periodicals and newspapers

Non-fiction

Novels

Short story collections

Notes and references

Notes

References

Sources

External links

 
 
 
 Umslopogaas, She, & Allan Quatermain Full Series (1927)
 

 
Bibliographies by writer
Bibliographies of British writers